Limelight is a 1936 British musical film directed by Herbert Wilcox and starring Arthur Tracy, Anna Neagle and Jane Winton. It was released in the U.S. as Backstage.

Plot
When chorus girl Marjorie (Anna Neagle) discovers singer Bob (Arthur Tracy) busking in the streets, and the star of her show falls ill, she persuades her producer to give him a break. Sure enough, Bob becomes an overnight sensation, but success unfortunately goes to his head.

Cast
 Arthur Tracy as Bob Grant
 Anna Neagle as Marjorie Kaye 
 Jane Winton as Ray Madison 
 Ellis Jeffreys as Lady Madeleine 
 Muriel George as Mrs. Kaye 
 Alexander Field as Alf Sparks  
 Anthony Holles as Impresario  
 William Freshman as Joe  
 Helena Pickard as Pixie  
 Queenie Leonard as Queenie  
 Ralph Reader as Ralph  
 Tilly Losch as Dancer 
 W. MacQueen Pope as Press Representative  
 Ronald Shiner as Asst. Stage Manager  
 Andreas Malandrinos as Singer

Production
The film was the first made by Wilcox's independent production company, Herbert Wilcox Productions, at his Elstree Studios. It was distributed by J. Arthur Rank's newly formed General Film Distributors, ending a previous arrangement Wilcox had with United Artists. The story was based on Anna Neagle's "discovery" by Wilcox when singing in a show with Jack Buchanan' Buchanan agreed to play a role based on himself. The film was known as Street Singer's Serenade.

The film was an attempt to make a more populist contemporary hit, moving away from the more expensive costume pictures such as Nell Gwynn and Peg of Old Drury which Wilcox had recently made starring Anna Neagle. For this film Wilcox partnered her with the popular American singer Arthur Tracy.

This drama musical romance features Arthur Tracy's street singing. The film's Dance Director was Ralph Reader. His work was so appreciated by Herbert Wilcox that he created a part for Reader to dance with Neagle in the actual film.

Critical reception
Allmovie wrote, "in addition to the two stars, Limelight is enlivened by the dancing prowess of the legendary Tilly Losch; also showing up for an uncredited cameo is stage and screen luminary Jack Buchanan.

References

Bibliography
 Low, Rachael. Filmmaking in 1930s Britain. George Allen & Unwin, 1985.
 Wood, Linda. British Films, 1927-1939. British Film Institute, 1986.

External links
 
 
 

1936 films
1936 romantic drama films
1930s romantic musical films
British black-and-white films
1930s English-language films
Films directed by Herbert Wilcox
British romantic musical films
British romantic drama films
Films shot at Imperial Studios, Elstree
1930s British films